The Chevrolet E-Spark was Chevrolet's proposed electric car for the Indian market. It was supposed to be an entry level hatchback based on the Chevrolet Spark.  

E-Spark was to be a joint venture between General Motors (GM) and RECC (Reva Electric Car Company) with GM providing the Chevrolet Spark platform and RECC providing the electric motor-battery kit. Unveiled in Auto Expo 2010, New Delhi, this car was supposed to hit the Indian consumers in October.
 
But everything changed with Mahindra picking up 55.2% controlling stake in the Bangalore based Maini Group that owns RECC and the project was cancelled as Mahindra and GM are rival competitors in the Indian auto industry

See also
Chevrolet Spark EV

References

Electric concept cars
E-Spark